is a Japanese professional footballer who plays as a winger for J1 League club Gamba Osaka.

Career statistics

Club
.

Notes

References

External links

Profile at Gamba Osaka

2003 births
Living people
Japanese footballers
Japan youth international footballers
Association football midfielders
J3 League players
J1 League players
Gamba Osaka players
Gamba Osaka U-23 players